The Movement for the Defence of the Republic is a political party in Cameroon, led by Dakolé Daïssala.

History
The party first contested national elections in 1992, when it won six seats in the parliamentary elections. In the 1997 elections the party was reduced to a single seat, and lost its one seat in the 2002 elections.

In the 2013 parliamentary elections the party regained parliamentary representation, winning one seat.

Electoral history

Presidential Elections

National Assembly elections

References 

Political parties in Cameroon